Huamachuco (possibly from Quechua waman, falcon or variable hawk, and Kulyi chuco, earth or land, "land of falcons") is a town in northern Peru and capital of the province Sánchez Carrión in La Libertad Region. The city is the seat of the Territorial Prelature of Huamachuco. Lake Sausacocha lies to the northeast.

About 30 miles away, within the Huamachuco district, is the significant archeological site of Marcahuamachuco. It is a complex of monuments, a prehistoric political and religious center of a culture that thrived 350 CE-1100 CE. The ruins of a Wari city, Viracochapampa, are located 3.5 km north of Huamachuco. Additionally there are many other pre-Columbian ruins around the town.

History 
The area surrounding the town exhibits early occupations of ancient Andean civilizations. Before the advent of the Incas the area was united under a single political entity referred to as the "Señorio de Huamachuco" (Huamachuco lordship) by colonial chroniclers, a Kulyi-speaking polity that had as their main deity the thunder god of Catequil, an oracle and the principal wak'a of the Huamachucos, later incorporated into the official Inca pantheon, whose shrine was located in the center of Huamachucos' territory, archaeologists have identified the mountain of Cerro Icchal with Catequil (both as the seat of the wak'a and as the wak'a himself), the ruins of Namanchugo, Catequil's main sanctuary, are situated at the hillfoot of the Cerro Icchal mountain, although it has been largely destroyed by Atawallpa and colonial priests, its magnificence and importance was recorded by colonial chroniclers, Catequil was a famous god venerated through the northern Peruvian highlands and beyond since pre-Inca times, pilgrims seeking to find answers were one of the main sources of income to the Huamachucos, the shrine prosperity is perhaps one of the reasons why the area surrounding Huamachuco does not seem to have been seriously affected, as large parts of the Peruvian highlands were, by the demographic collapse following the end of the Middle Horizon era (Wari state's demise), rather population growth appears to be continuous in the area.

Indigenous settlement patterns within the Huamachuco area can be divided into 8 phases:
Colpa phase (? to 900 BC)
Sausagocha phase (900 - 200 BC)
Purpucala phase (200 BC - AD 300)
Early-Huamachuco phase (AD 300 - 600)
Amaru phase (AD 600 - 800?)
Late-Huamachuco phase (AD 800? - 1000)
Tuscan phase (AD 1000 - 1470)
Santa Bárbara phase (AD 1470 - 1532).

The Tuscan phase, the penultimate phase, corresponds to the historical autonomous domain of Huamachuco. And the Santa Barbara phase corresponds to the Inca domination of Huamachuco. The Huamachuco domain or kingdom probably established its capital at Marcahuamachuco, the ruins of Marcahuamachuco shows evident occupation since the Early-Huamachuco phase up to the Tuscan phase. Following the Inca conquest, the Marcahuamachuco population was likely resettled where the modern town of Huamachuco stands today.

The town of Huamachuco was originally built by the Inca as their main installation in the zone, Huamachuco became the capital seat of an Inca province (wamani) of the same name. The Inca town of Huamachuco doesn't seem to have been built upon any previous settlement, the pre-Inca hill fort of Cerro Tuscán, overlooking the town, seems to have been enhanced to protect the Inca settlement. With the Incas came enclaves of settlers called mitmaqkuna and an extensive system of tambos was built in the area, both things supported by archaeological research. The Inca administrative center of Huamachuco was a stopover on the main Inca highway of Cusco to Quito, the "Qhapaq Ñan" or "Royal Road". The Incas built at least 215 colca storehouses on the hillslopes surrounding the town, roughly half of these have floors elevated on stone pillars, the other storerooms have canals running under the floors, these were probably for tubers.

The Spanish foundation of Huamachuco was made in 1553 by Augustinian missionaries on top of Inca's Huamachuco. During the Peruvian War of Independence, it was named as a very illustrious and faithful city by General Jose de San Martin. During the War of the Pacific, Huamachuco was the scene of the Battle of Huamachuco (10 July 1883), the final episode of the Pacific War where troops led by Andrés Avelino Cáceres were defeated by Chilean troops under Colonel Alejandro Gorostiaga.

Etymology 
It is not clear whether the name of the city comes from the Kulyi language, the autochthonous language of the area, or from Quechua, a language from central Peru that reached its heyday during the Inca Empire. Most scholars believe the name to be of a mixed origin between both languages, it would mean "land of falcons" or "country of falcons". The name Huamachuco can be divided into two words, "huama" and "chuco", it has been postulated that huama comes from the Quechua word waman which means falcon, as it has no known meaning in Kulyi, a poorly attested extinct language, while chuco is of likely Kulyi origin, meaning earth, land, region, or country, being a commonly used term throughout the toponymy of the region, alternatively written as chugo. Otherwise, chuco can be translated as helmet or headwear in Quechua, which would give the city the meaning of "falcon hat", however, modern linguists deny that such is the right meaning of the city's name.

Geography
Huamachuco is located between the eastern and western cordillera of the Andes Mountains, and 100 km south of Cajamarca.

It has highland areas that range from 2500 to 4500 m. above sea level. Because of the heights, most of Huamachuco's land is treeless. The high-altitude grassland is known as puna. The highland is bounded on the east and west by two parallel sierra ranges. The puna grasslands were ideal habitats for deer and wild camelids. They also supported the domesticated camelids: alpacas and llamas. 

Huamachuco's deep valley slopes show evidence of deliberate farming of native Andean trees and shrub vegetation. It appears that in prehistoric times, the temperature of the land was slightly warmer than today, allowing agriculture at elevations 100–300 m. higher than is possible in the 20th and 21st centuries.

Banks
Branch of Caja Trujillo.
Branch of Nuestra Gente.
Branch of Banco de la Nacion.
Branch of Caja Piura.

See also
Feast of Saint Francis
Marcahuamachuco
La Libertad Region
Racing de Huamachuco
Trujillo, Peru

References

External links

  Official municipal website

Cities in La Libertad Region
Populated places in La Libertad Region
Populated places established in 1553